Andreas Hofgaard Winsnes (25 October 1889 – 9 July 1972) was a Norwegian literary historian and educator.

Biography
Winsnes  was born in Nord-Odal,  Norway. He was the son of Frederik Vilhelm Vinsnes (1837-1920) and Agnete Helweg (1850-1918). He completed his examen artium in 1908 at Oslo Cathedral School. He became Cand.philol. from the Royal Danish Academy of Fine Arts in 1913 and  Dr.philos. in 1920. 

In 1937, Winsnes became a lecturer in German literature and was appointed professor at the University of Oslo from 1937. During World War II, he became director of the Norwegian-British Institute in London from 1942-45. After the war, he was editor of  Samtiden from 1945-46. In 1953, he was among the founders of the Norwegian Academy (Det Norske Akademi for Språk og Litteratur). 
He held the position of professor of  philosophical language analysis at the University of Oslo until he took leave in 1959.

Winsnes ia most associated with the literary history Norsk litteraturhistorie. I - VI.  Consisting of four volumes which were published between  1924–1937, this was  a collaborative work  with Francis Bull, Fredrik Paasche and Philip Houm. Among his other works are his thesis about Johan Nordahl Brun from 1919 and biographies of Sigrid Undset and Hans E. Kinck.

Selected works
 Den norske roman i 1870–80-aarene (1920)
 Det norske selskab: 1772–1812 (1924)
 Niels Treschow: en opdrager til menneskelighet (1927)
 Skillelinjer: fem artikler om samtidig tenkning (1929)
 Den annen front: engelske idealister (1932)
 Sigrid Undset: en studie i kristen realism (1949)
 Diktning og livssyn (1949)

References

1889 births
1972 deaths
People from Nord-Odal
People educated at Oslo Cathedral School
Royal Danish Academy of Fine Arts alumni
Academic staff of the University of Oslo
Norwegian educators
Norwegian literary historians
Norwegian people of World War II
Norwegian expatriates in the United Kingdom